California Shakespeare Theater ("Cal Shakes") is a regional theater located in the San Francisco Bay Area of California. Its performance space, the Lt. G. H. Bruns III Memorial Amphitheater, is located in Orinda, while the administrative offices, rehearsal hall, costume and prop shop are located in Berkeley.

History
Founded as the Emeryville Shakespeare Company, the company began performances with Hamlet, performing several shows at scattered churches and venues around the East Bay.  It became established 1974 in John Hinkle Park in Berkeley, with productions of A Midsummer Night's Dream with Deborist Benjamin as Peaseblossom, following her role as Celia in the premier production of As You Like It, and The Tempest (with Rolf Saxon).  

It was founded by a group of amateurs who wanted the enjoyment and experience of acting and production: no one was paid, and the plays were free.

The company produced several more plays in 1974–1975, including Pantagleize by Michel de Ghelderode during the winter, All's Well That Ends Well in the spring, and summer productions of Twelfth Night with Sigrid Wurschmidt, and a transfer of the Berkeley High School production of As You Like It.

Berkeley Shakespeare Festival
After 1975, the name changed and the fest started a schedule of four plays per ivalyear that continues to this day, although more non-Shakespeare plays are now on the bill. Dakin Matthews was Artistic Director from 1983–1987, with Michael Addison taking over as A.D. in 1987 and holding the position till 1995.

California Shakespeare Festival  
In 1991, the festival built its current performance venue, the 545-seat Bruns Memorial Amphitheater in the Orinda hills, and changed its name to California Shakespeare Festival. In 1995, actor Joe Vincent took over the theater's artistic direction, serving till 1999.

In 2000, Jonathan Moscone was appointed its Artistic Director. In his first season at Cal Shakes, Moscone directed a production of Tom Stoppard's Rosencrantz and Guildenstern Are Dead; the company continued to produce one non-Shakespeare play a year until 2005, when its productions of The Life and Adventures of Nicholas Nickleby, Parts One & Two (Charles Dickens, adapted by David Edgar) began a tradition of two Shakespeare plays and two non-Shakespeare plays each season.

Cal Shakes 
In 2003, the company officially changed its name, again, to California Shakespeare Theater, or Cal Shakes. In 2009, Susie Falk was named Managing Director, following the departure of Debbie Chinn. In late 2009, Moscone was chosen by the Stage Directors and Choreographers Foundation (SDCF) as the inaugural recipient of the Zelda Fichandler Award. The award was created to recognize an outstanding director or choreographer who is transforming the regional arts landscape through his singular creativity and artistry in theater.

In 2015, Jonathan Moscone stepped down as Artistic Director after 15 years. His final production was Charles Ludham's The Mystery of Irma Vep in August/September of the same year.

Eric Ting was chosen as its new Artistic Director joining in the fall of 2015. His first production was 2016's Othello, produced with minimal sets and costumes in service of a community tour of the same production that fall. The production got some searing reviews and drew a strong response from many longtime patrons, but ten years later it is cited as a powerful production that allowed actors to speak their truth.

In 2017, Ting directed the first production of Cal Shakes' New Classics Initiative, the West Coast premiere of black odyssey, by Oakland native Marcus Gardley, directed by Eric Ting. This reimagining of Homer’s Odyssey as the journey of an African American soldier returning from deployment in Afghanistan to his home in Oakland broke Cal Shakes single ticket sales records, garnered seven Theatre Bay Area Awards, and was hailed as one of CalShakes' best productions ever.

“Oakland playwright Marcus Gardley smashes together Homer and black folklore, East Bay references, aching tragedy and gospel music in a white hot musical fable that’s as brilliant as it is badass. One of the most thrilling shows of the summer by far, a heartstoppingly relevant interpretation of Homer’s “The Odyssey,” the production that opened Saturday in Orinda is every bit as emotionally compelling as it is smart and wildly inventive.” – Karen D’Souza, Bay Area News Group

black odyssey garnered 11 nominations and seven Theatre Bay Area Awards, including: Outstanding Production, Outstanding Ensemble, Outstanding Male Actor (Aldo Billingslea), Outstanding Female Actor (Margo Hall), Outstanding Direction (Eric Ting), Outstanding Costume Design (Dede Ayite), and the Creative Specialties award to Marcus Gardley for his adaptation of Homer’s Odyssey.

In 2018, Ting directed The War of the Roses, a supercut of William Shakespeare's minor tetralogy (Henry VI parts 1, 2, and 3 and Richard III), co-adapted by Ting and resident dramaturg Philippa Kelly. In 2019, he directed The Good Person of Schezwan, written by Bertolt Brecht, translated by Wendy Arons, adapted by Tony Kushner.

Notable participants 
 Directors
 Amanda Denhert
 Kate Whoriskey

 Designers
 Christopher Akerlind
 Brian Sidney Bembridge
 Todd Rosenthal

 Actors
 Mahershala Ali
 Annette Bening
 Stephen Barker Turner
 James Carpenter
 Emilio Delgado
 Jeffrey DeMunn
 Michael Emerson
 Anthony Heald
 Patrick Kerr
 Ravi Kapoor
 Carrie Preston
 Reg Rogers
 Douglas Sills
 John Vickery
 Zendaya

Artistic learning
In 1979, Berkeley Shakespeare Festival began Summer with Shakespeare programs, six-week camps for ages 14–18, culminating with a performance in the John Hinkel Park amphitheater. The camps have continued, in one form or another, to this day, going under several different names (Camp, Conservatory, Summer Theater Programs). In 2009, the camps were offered to ages 8–18 in two- and five-week increments, with locations in Lafayette, Oakland, Orinda, and El Cerrito. Participants study acting, physical comedy, stage combat, movement, improvisation, and text, and the camps still culminate in a Shakespeare performance by each age group.

Also in 1979, the festival began holding fall classes, a training program in all facets of classical theater including voice and movement, period style, scansion, stage combat, and other production aspects. Also offered was an introduction to classical drama in both its literary and theatrical aspects. Fall and spring classes for youth and adults were offered as recently as spring of 2009.

California Shakespeare Theater also presents Student Discovery Matinees, afternoon performances of Shakespeare productions for school groups that include pre-show activities geared toward youth. In 2001, they began teaching pre- and post–show workshops wherein Cal Shakes teaching artists visit classrooms in order to enrich and support the Student Discovery Matinee experience. That same year, Berkeley’s Malcolm X Arts Magnet Elementary School and Pinole Valley High School hosted playwright Karen Hartman in Cal Shakes residencies; Hartman taught creative writing and storytelling in both residencies, and each one culminated in a presentation of the students’ works directed by Jonathan Moscone. In 2007, Cal Shakes received the first of several grants from the NEA's Shakespeare in American Communities initiative to expand its residency program and Student Discovery Matinee activities.  The theater now offers classroom residencies, after school programs, and home school programs throughout the Bay Area.

New Works/New Communities (2003-2010)
In 2003, Cal Shakes launched New Works/New Communities (NW/NC) with the aim of engaging marginalized communities while creating new works of theater based on the classics. Hamlet: Blood in the Brain was the first major NW/NC project, partnering Cal Shakes with playwright Naomi Iizuka and San Francisco's Campo Santo, resident theater company at Intersection for the Arts  to relocate Shakespeare's Hamlet to the 1980s-era drug-ravaged streets of East Oakland. The two-year process (2004–2006) included interviews with former drug lords and Shakespearean scholars; writing workshops in schools, juvenile halls, and churches; and Q&A panels attended by the public. It culminated in a sold-out, eight-week run of the play directed by Moscone at Intersection for the Arts. In 2010, the Advanced Drama Department at Oakland Technical High School revisited Hamlet: Blood in the Brain, choosing the play as their entry in the American High School Theatre Festival, which they won. The Oakland Tech students then performed their production at the Edinburgh Fringe Festival in August 2010.

From 2005-2007, the NW/NC program developed King of Shadows, an adaptation of A Midsummer Night's Dream by Roberto Aguirre-Sacasa that took place in San Francisco, with gay urban youth at its center. Cal Shakes partnered with MFA students at American Conservatory Theater and community organizations such as Larkin Street Youth Services, Guerrero House, and LYRIC (Lavender Youth Recreation and Information Center) for discussions, workshops, and field trips.

In 2005 Cal Shakes began a partnership with Write to Read, a juvenile hall literacy program run by the Alameda County Library, holding writing workshops based on Hamlet: Blood in the Brain. In 2007, actor and Cal Shakes Associate Artist Andy Murray began to teach workshops and extended residencies using Shakespeare to develop the public speaking, leadership, and cooperation skills of the juvenile hall residents.

In 2007, Cal Shakes commissioned San Francisco playwright Octavio Solis to adapt The Pastures of Heaven, an early novel of interconnected stories about farm life in the Salinas Valley by John Steinbeck. The project partnered Cal Shakes with Word for Word Performing Arts Company for a series of development workshops; community partners include the National Steinbeck Center and Alisal Center for Fine Arts, both located in Salinas. The adapted work is the first play specifically commissioned for California Shakespeare's Main Stage, and had its world premiere in June 2010, directed by Jonathan Moscone.

New Classics Initiative 
The aim of the New Classics Initiative is to explore what it means to be a classical theater in the 21st century, and to allow living writers with the same vision and scope of Shakespeare to expand the classical canon and by extension, what is thought of as universal. Piloted in 2017 with Marcus Gardley's black odyssey and officially launched with 2018's Quixote Nuevo by Octavio Solis, the New Classics Initiative continues in 2019 with the world premiere of House of Joy by Madhuri Shekar. Future NCI productions will reimagine classic Western drama through a diversity of form and content, cultural and gender perspectives, and adaptation and reinvention.

Venue

Cal Shakes mount performances at the Bruns Memorial Amphitheater in Siesta Valley just outside Orinda, California. The space was funded by a capital campaign led by Clarence Woodard and named in memory of the late son of George and Sue Bruns. The amphitheater was designed by architect Eugene Angell.

References

External links
 

Shakespeare festivals in the United States
Regional theatre in the United States
Theatre companies in California
Theatre companies in Berkeley, California
Theatre in the San Francisco Bay Area
Performing groups established in 1974
1974 establishments in California
Orinda, California